Minnesota North College – Rainy River, previously Rainy River Community College, is a public community college in International Falls, Minnesota. In 2022, the board of trustees of the Minnesota State Colleges and Universities merged the college with several others into a single institution called Minnesota North College.

Academics
The campus offers the Associate in Arts degree, Associate in Science degree, and certificate programs. It also provides several programs shared with other colleges.

Athletics
As part of Minnesota North College, a member of the Minnesota College Athletic Conference (MCAC) National Junior College Athletic Association (NJCAA), Voyageur Athletics include baseball, softball, men's basketball, women's basketball, and volleyball.

Student activities
The campus offers an 18-hole disc golf course, a lighted cross country trail for skiing and hiking, and several water features including ponds, decks, and walkways. The campus has an active Phi Theta Kappa honor society and Student Senate. They also hold different events during the year including Awareness Week, and Diversity Week.

Library
The campus library has 20,000 books and an online public access catalog available 24 hours a day. There are 70 computers available on campus for general student use. There is a staffed computer lab providing training of computers, technology, software, and the Internet.

References

External links

Two-year colleges in the United States
Education in Koochiching County, Minnesota
Educational institutions established in 1967
Buildings and structures in Koochiching County, Minnesota
Community colleges in Minnesota
Minnesota North College
NJCAA athletics